The Penya Rhin Grand Prix was a Grand Prix motor racing event staged at the three different circuits in three different eras in Spain. The race was held intermittently over its history, sometimes for full-size Grand Prix cars, sometimes for sports cars. In the 1920s, it was held at a street circuit in Vilafranca del Penedès. In the 1930s the race was revived at a parkland circuit in Montjuïc. In the 1950s after the war it was held at the Pedralbes Circuit.

 
Pre-World Championship Grands Prix
Formula One non-championship races
Recurring sporting events established in 1921